The Lilac Domino is a 1937 British operetta film directed by Frederic Zelnik and starring Michael Bartlett, June Knight and Fred Emney. It was made at Welwyn Studios with sets designed by Oscar Friedrich Werndorff. It is based on the 1918 version of the operetta The Lilac Domino.

Partial cast
 Michael Bartlett as Count Anatole de Karefi 
 June Knight as Shari de Gonda 
 Fred Emney as Baron Ladislas de Gonda 
 Paul Blake as Cousin Andor de Gonda 
 S.Z. Sakall as Sandor 
 Richard Dolman as Steffen 
 Cameron Hall as Arnim 
 Athene Seyler as Mme. Alary 
 Morris Harvey as Janos 
 Jane Carr as Leonie 
 Robert Nainby as Biro
 Joan Hickson as Katrina 
 Fewlass Llewellyn as Chauffeur
 Ralph Truman as Doorman
 Mark Daly
 Norma Varden
 Julie Suedo

References

Bibliography
Low, Rachael. Filmmaking in 1930s Britain. George Allen & Unwin, 1985.
Wood, Linda. British Films, 1927–1939. British Film Institute, 1986.

External links

1937 films
British musical films
British black-and-white films
1937 musical films
Films directed by Frederic Zelnik
Films shot at Welwyn Studios
Operetta films
Films based on operettas
Films set in Budapest
1930s English-language films
1930s British films